Hits U Missed is a 2004 compilation album from Hip Hop artist Masta Ace, released through his self-owned M3 record label. The compilation features a number of singles released during his MIA period between 1996 and 2000, as well as a few B-Side songs from past singles.

Track listing
"Conflict" Featuring Guru
Originally released on the "Conflict" single (2000, Mona Records)
"Top 10 List"
Originally released on the "Turn it Up" single (1996, Delicious Vinyl Records)
"Ghetto Like"
Originally released on the "Ghetto Like" single (2000, Fat Beats)
"Last Bref"
Originally released on the "Brooklyn Blocks" single (2000, Duck Down Records)
"Observations" Featuring Apocalypse
Originally released on the Prime Cuts compilation (2000, Delicious Vinyl Records)
"Hellbound" Featuring Eminem and J-Black
Originally released on the Game Over compilation (2000, Yosumi Records)
"The Outcome"
Originally released on the "Ghetto Like" single (2000, Fat Beats)
"Splash"
Originally released on the Hip Hop 101 compilation (2000, Tommy Boy Records)
"Cars" Featuring Spunk Bigga
Originally released on the "Cars" single (1998, Tape Kingz/INC Records)
"Rap 2K1"
Originally released on the Game Over II compilation (2001, JCOR Records)
"Brooklyn Blocks" Featuring Buckshot
Originally released on the "Brooklyn Blocks" single (2000, Duck Down Records)
"Spread it Out"
Originally released on the Game Over compilation (2000, Yosumi Records)
"NY Confidential"
Originally released on the "NY Confidential" single (1999, Replay Records)
"Ya Hardcore"
Originally released on the Sittin' on Chrome EP (1995, Delicious Vinyl Records)
"Maintain" Featuring Lord Digga
Originally released on the Sittin' on Chrome EP (1995, Delicious Vinyl Records)

Masta Ace albums
2004 compilation albums